Muskegon Mall was an enclosed shopping mall in downtown Muskegon, Michigan. Opened in 1976, it closed in 2001 and was torn down for redevelopment.

History

Muskegon Mall construction began in 1974, and the mall opened for business on March 27, 1976. Created by enclosing three blocks of Western Avenue and building a department store at each end - Sears at one end, and Grand Rapids-based Steketee's at the other - the mall also resulted in the closure of parts of First, Second, and Jefferson streets. Incorporated as a third anchor, an existing store, Hardy's, had been in operation since 1881, and its store was partnered with Herpolsheimer's after being rebuilt in 1946.

The most popular shopping center in Muskegon County by 1989, the Hardy's-Herpolsheimer's store closed the same year. By 1992, its space had become Burlington Coat Factory, while the mall was sold to Harold Back and Richard Perlman. The mall continued to lose tenants throughout the 1990s, when retail stores were built along Sternberg Road at US Highway 31 southeast of town.

When The Lakes Mall opened in that area in 2001, Sears relocated there from Muskegon Mall, and Steketee's closed. Muskegon Mall closed in December 2001 and demolition began on the structure in November 2003. The site was used for redevelopment, such as the reopening of Western Avenue to traffic and the construction of new buildings on the former mall site.

References

Shopping malls in Michigan
Shopping malls established in 1976
Shopping malls disestablished in 2001
Demolished shopping malls in the United States
Buildings and structures in Muskegon, Michigan
1976 establishments in Michigan
2001 disestablishments in Michigan
Demolished buildings and structures in Michigan
Buildings and structures demolished in 2003